Suzak (/ Сузоқ) is a village in Jalal-Abad Region, Kyrgyzstan. Its population was 30,534 in 2021. It is the administrative seat of Suzak District.

History

The first mention of Suzak village is known from a map of Eugene Schuyler "Map of the Khanates of Bukhara, Khiva, and Kokand and Part of Russian Turkestan" of 1875.

In 1998 a catastrophic flood of the river Kögart destroyed around 1,000 dwellings in Suzak.

Elections in Suzak

Suzak, in addition, has anomalously high "Against All" voter turnout. Yet most anomalous are the results from Kara-Suu and Suzak both. These districts are not urban, being most rural, and are located along the Kyrgyzstan-Uzbekistan border. Because these areas lack significant population, widespread higher education, or any notable Russian populations, it appears that "the established explanatory model fails to fully account for what happened in these two areas. Instead of demographic characteristics, we must instead take into account the recent political history in order to understand why the people in Kara-Suu and Suzak might have voted in such high numbers 'against all.'".

References

Populated places in Jalal-Abad Region